Nancy Rubin Stuart (née Nancy R. Zimman; b.1944 ), formerly known as Nancy Rubin, is an author, journalist, Executive Director of the Cape Cod Writers Center, a cable television writer-producer and a former board member of the Women Writing Women's Lives  seminar for the City University of New York Graduate Center.

Biography

Stuart is a 1966 graduate of Jackson College, Tufts University. She received her Master of Arts in Teaching from Brown University in 1967.

Stuart was a contributor to the New York Times from 1977-2001 in the Westchester, Long Island, Travel, National Career Survey, Education Life and News in Review sections under the byline of Nancy Rubin. Several articles appeared in 2000-2001 in the Workplace section of The New York Times under the byline Nancy Rubin Stuart.  Stuart also contributed articles to other publications on a variety of topics.

Stuart was a Time Inc. Fellow at the Bread Loaf Writers' Conference in 1979 and a 1981 Fellow at the MacDowell Colony. Stuart won the American Society of Journalists and Authors'  1992 Author of the Year for Isabella of Castile (St. Martin's Press, 1991, 1992). Mount Vernon College (now part of George Washington University) conferred a Doctor of Humane Letters upon Stuart in 1995 for her biography of Marjorie Merriweather Post "American Empress."  The American Society of Journalists and Authors named Stuart's 2005 book " The Reluctant Spiritualist" (Harcourt, Inc.) Honorable Mention for its Outstanding Book Award of 2006.  That book was also nominated for the New York Historical Society's first Best Historical Book award. In 2005 Stuart received a William Randolph Hearst Fellowship from the American Antiquarian Society for research on The Muse of the Revolution (Beacon Press, 2008, 2009). The Muse of the Revolution received the 2009 Book Award for historical scholarship from the Historic 1699 Winslow House and was a finalist for the 2010 USA Book News Best Book Award. Stuart's recent book "Defiant Brides: The Untold Story of Two Revolutionary-Era Women and the Radical Men They Married" is a 2013 selection of the History Book Club, the Book-of-the-Month-2 Book Club (BOMC2) and the Military Book Club.

Stuart served as a writer for Cinetel Productions in A&E Network's America's Castles (Series 1-3), including The Industrial Barons, The Anglophiles, The Best of Charleston, The Lone Start Estates, Palaces in Paradise, Scottish Links & Lairds, University Estates, The Eccentrics and The New York Estates between 1996-1998 for which she won an Excellence in Writing Telly Award. From 1999-2001 she served as a writer-producer for Scripps Production's Restore America series for HGTV and received two additional Telly Awards. Stuart has also written for American History, the Huffington Post, the New England Quarterly and served as a columnist for the Barnstable Patriot.

Stuart has appeared on national television, radio, in podcasts and in videos. In 2021 and 2022 her appearances included Revolution 250, We the People, the American Philosophical Society, the Massachusetts Historical Society, Sirius XM Radio’s “The Revolution Road,” The Daughters of the American Revolution National Book Club, the Valley Forge National Historical Park Book Club, The Fraunces Tavern, Poor Richard’s Book Club, History Camp and others.

Since moving from New York to Massachusetts with her husband, Stuart serves as executive director of the Cape Cod Writers Center. Beacon Press published her latest book, POOR RICHARD'S WOMEN: Deborah Reade Franklin and the Other Women Behind the Founding Father in March 2022 which Library Journal’s starred review noted was " a terrific read: poignant, provocative, and probing.”

Awards 
2010    Finalist, USA Book News Best Book Award for The Muse of the Revolution (Beacon Press) 
2009    Historic Winslow House Best Book Award for The Muse of the Revolution (Beacon Press) 
2006    Honorable Mention, Outstanding book of the Year for The Reluctant Spiritualist (Harcourt, Inc.) from the American Society of Journalists and Authors 
1992    Author of the Year Award for Isabella of Castile from the American Society of Journalists and Authors (St. Martin's Press)

Bibliography

Books
Rubin, Nancy (1982). The New Suburban Woman: Beyond Myth and Motherhood. New York: Coward, McCann & Geoghegan. 
Rubin, Nancy (1984). The Mother Mirror: How A Generation of Women Is Changing Motherhood in America. New York: G.P.Putnam's Sons. 
Rubin, Nancy (1991). Isabella of Castile: The First Renaissance Queen. New York: St. Martin's Press. 
Rubin, Nancy (1995). American Empress: The Life and Times of Marjorie Merriweather Post. New York: Villard Books. 
Stuart, Nancy Rubin (2005). The Reluctant Spiritualist: The Life of Maggie Fox. New York: Harcourt, Inc. 
Stuart, Nancy Rubin (2008). The Muse of the Revolution: The Secret Pen of Mercy Otis Warren and the Founding of a Nation. Boston: Beacon Press 
Stuart, Nancy Rubin (2013). Defiant Brides: The Untold Story of Two Revolutionary Era Women and the Radical Men They Married. Boston: Beacon Press 
Stuart, Nancy Rubin (2022). Poor Richard's Women:  Deborah Read Franklin and the Other Women Behind the Founding Father. Boston: Beacon Press 
Selected essays and articles
 "A Founding Mother on Women's History Month," Huffington Post, March 18, 2014. http://www.huffingtonpost.com/nancy-rubin-stuart/mercy-otis-warren-on-womens-history-month_b_4981181.html
 "Traitor Bride," American History, February 2014. pp. 42–49.
 "Historical Origins of Valentine's Day," Huffington Post, February 13, 2014. http://www.huffingtonpost.com/nancy-rubin-stuart/historical-origins-of-val_b_4775869.html
 "A Birdbrained Approach to Income Inequities," Huffington Post, January 21, 20114. http://www.huffingtonpost.com/nancy-rubin-stuart/a-birdbrained-income-inequality_b_4612479.html
 "Rebellion, Love and Revolution," American History, October 2013. pp. 42–47.
 "Influenza: The Fast-Track Virus," Huffington Post, January 17, 2013
 "Rites and Lights of the Winter Solstice," Huffington Post, December 19, 2012
 "Columbus Day and the Arab Spring," Huffington Post, October 5, 2012
 "Thanksgiving and the National Bird," Huffington Post, November 20, 2012
 "Shark Sightings on Wall Street," Huffington Post, August 7, 2012
 "House Guest Season," Huffington Post, July 30, 2012
 "U.S. Poet Laureate Natasha Trethewey Strives to Revive the 'Ghost of History'," Huffington Post, June 14, 2012
 "Cape ways, Manhattan pays," Barnstable Patriot, May 2012
 "A Single Hour That Can Save the Day," New York Times, April 2011.
 “ Women Vs. Women,” Ladies Home Journal, April 1982.
 “The Convex Mirror: A Queen, An Heiress and Biographical Blindness,” American Imago, V.55, No.2, Summer 1998.
 "Biographer’s Dilemma: The Humanization of an Infamous Historical Figure,” Biography and Source Studies, AMS Press, v. 2, 1996.
 “Their lives inspire when put into print,” The Baltimore Sun, March 22, 2005.
 “Conscience of the Revolution,” American History, August 2008.
 "Portrait of a Patriot: The Major Political and Legal Papers of Josiah Quincy Junior," New England Quarterly, v. LXXXII, No. 1, March 2009.
 "Guest Commentary: Old Roads of Cape Cod," Barnstable Patriot, v. LXXXII, No. 1, March 2009.
 "Rebellion, Love and Revoluition," American HIstory Magazine, October 2013.
 "Traitor Bride," American History Magazine, February 2014.
“The Big Blow of January 2015” Huffington Post  January 28, 2015 http://www.huffingtonpost.com/nancy-rubin-stuart/the-big-blow-of-january-2_b_6557106.html
Empress of Journalism:  Miriam Folline Peacock Squier Leslie Wilde turned the newspaper business on its head—and left the spoils to American suffragists, AMERICAN HISTORY MAGAZINE February 2015   pp. 43–49. maericn– http://www.historynet.com/table-of-contents-february-2015-american-history-magazine.htm#sthash.rbIqcvfh.dpuf

References

External links

1944 births
Living people
American women journalists
American women writers
Brown University alumni
Tufts University School of Arts and Sciences alumni
21st-century American women